Stéphane Patrick Gombauld (born 5 March 1997) is a French professional basketball player who plays for SLUC Nancy.

Professional career
In September 2020, Gombauld signed for Mladost Zemun of the Adriatic League and the SLUC Nancy.

National team career 
Gombauld was a member of the France national under-16 team that won the silver medal at the 2012 FIBA Europe Under-16 Championship in Lithuania. Over nine tournament games, he averaged 4.2 points and 3.7 rebounds per game. Also, he was a team member at the 2013 FIBA Europe Under-16 Championship in Kyev, Ukraine. Over nine tournament games, he averaged 16.0 points and 8.8 rebounds per game.

Gombauld was a member of the U17 France national team at the 2014 FIBA Under-17 World Championship in Dubai, the United Arab Emirates. Over seven tournament games, he averaged 15.4 points and 10.3 rebounds per game. 

Gombauld was a member of the U18 France national team at the 2015 FIBA Europe Under-18 Championship in Volos, Greece. Over nine tournament games, he averaged 11.4 points and 7.7 rebounds per game.

Gombauld was a member of the France national under-20 team that won the bronze medal at the 2017 FIBA U20 European Championship on the island of Crete in Greece. Over six tournament games, he averaged 3.0 points and 5.0 rebounds per game.

References

External links
 Stephane Gombauld at eurobasket.com
 Stephane Gombauld at proballers.com
 Stephane Gombauld at realgm.com
 Stephane Gombauld at aba-liga.com

1997 births
Living people
ADA Blois Basket 41 players
ASVEL Basket players
Basketball League of Serbia players
French expatriate basketball people in Serbia
French men's basketball players
Guadeloupean men's basketball players
KK Mladost Zemun players
Power forwards (basketball)
People from Saint-Claude, Guadeloupe
Saint-Chamond Basket players